In the mathematical field of topology, a topological space is usually defined by declaring its open sets. However, this is not necessary, as there are many equivalent axiomatic foundations, each leading to exactly the same concept. For instance, a topological space determines a class of closed sets, of closure and interior operators, and of convergence of various types of objects. Each of these can instead be taken as the primary class of objects, with all of the others (including the class of open sets) directly determined from that new starting point. For example, in Kazimierz Kuratowski's well-known textbook on point-set topology, a topological space is defined as a set together with a certain type of "closure operator," and all other concepts are derived therefrom. Likewise, the neighborhood-based axioms (in the context of Hausdorff spaces) can be retraced to Felix Hausdorff's original definition of a topological space in Grundzüge der Mengenlehre.

Many different textbooks use many different inter-dependences of concepts to develop point-set topology. The result is always the same collection of objects: open sets, closed sets, and so on. For many practical purposes, the question of which foundation is chosen is irrelevant, as long as the meaning and interrelation between objects (many of which are given in this article), which are the same regardless of choice of development, are understood. However, there are cases where it can be useful to have flexibility. For instance, there are various natural notions of convergence of measures, and it is not immediately clear whether they arise from a topological structure or not. Such questions are greatly clarified by the topological axioms based on convergence.

Standard definitions via open sets

A topological space is a set  together with a collection  of subsets of  satisfying:

Then one makes the following secondary definitions:
 Given a second topological space  a function  is said to be continuous if and only if for every open subset  of  one has that  is an open subset of 
 Given a subset  of  the closure is the set of all points such that any open set containing such a point must intersect 
 Given a subset  of  the interior is the union of all open sets contained in 
 One says that a net converges to a point  of  if for any open set  containing  the net is eventually contained in 
 Given a set  a filter is a collection of nonempty subsets of  that is closed under finite intersection and under supersets. Some textbooks allow a filter to contain the empty set, and reserve the name "proper filter" for the case in which it is excluded.
 Given a set  a filterbase is a collection of nonempty subsets such that every two subsets intersect nontrivially and contain a third subset in the intersection. Given a topology on  one says that a filterbase converges to a point  if every neighborhood of  contains some element of the filterbase.

Definition via closed sets

Let  be a topological space. According to De Morgan's laws, the collection  of closed sets satisfies the following properties:
Now suppose that  is only a set. This is to say that a topology can be defined by declaring the closed sets. As such, one can rephrase all definitions to be in terms of closed sets:
 Given a second topological space  a function  is continuous if and only if for every closed subset  of  the set  is closed as a subset of 
 given a subset  of  the closure is the intersection of all closed sets containing 
 given a subset  of  the interior is the complement of the intersection of all closed sets containing

Definition via closure operators

Given a topological space  the closure can be considered as a map  where  denotes the power set of  One has the following Kuratowski closure axioms:
 
 
 
 
If  is a set equipped with a mapping satisfying the above properties, then the set of all possible outputs of cl satisfies the previous axioms for closed sets, and hence defines a topology; it is the unique topology whose associated closure operator coincides with the given cl. As before, it follows that on a topological space  all definitions can be phrased in terms of the closure operator:
Given a second topological space  a function  is continuous if and only if for every subset  of  one has that the set  is a subset of 
 Given a subset  of  the interior is the complement of

Definition via interior operators

Given a topological space  the interior can be considered as a map  where  denotes the power set of  It satisfies the following conditions:
 
 
 
 
If  is a set equipped with a mapping satisfying the above properties, then the set of all possible outputs of int satisfies the previous axioms for open sets, and hence defines a topology; it is the unique topology whose associated interior operator coincides with the given int. It follows that on a topological space  all definitions can be phrased in terms of the interior operator, for instance:
 Given topological spaces  and  a function  is continuous if and only if for every subset  of  one has that the set  is a subset of 
 A set is open if and only if it equals its interior.
 The closure of a set is the complement of the interior of its complement.

Definition via neighbourhoods

Recall that this article follows the convention that a neighborhood is not necessarily open. In a topological space, one has the following facts:
 If  is a neighborhood of  then  is an element of 
 If  contains a neighborhood of  then  is a neighborhood of 
If  is a set and one declares a nonempty collection of neighborhoods for every point of  satisfying the above conditions, then a topology is defined by declaring a set to be open if and only if it is a neighborhood of each of its points; it is the unique topology whose associated system of neighborhoods is as given. It follows that on a topological space  all definitions can be phrased in terms of neighborhoods:
 Given a subset  of  the closure is the collection of all elements  of  such that every neighborhood of  intersects

Definition via convergence of nets

Convergence of nets satisfies the following properties:
Every constant net converges to itself.
Every subnet of a convergent net converges to the same limits.
If a net does not converge to a point  then there is a subnet such that no further subnet converges to  Equivalently, if  is a net such that every one of its subnets has a sub-subnet that converges to a point  then  converges to 
/Convergence of iterated limits.
 A  is refers to any subnet of  

Given a subset  of a topological space 
  is closed in  if and only if there does not exist a net in  that converges to an element of the complement  A subset  is closed in  if and only if every limit point of every convergent net in  necessarily belongs to  

Definition via convergence of filters

A topology can also be defined on a set by declaring which filters converge to which points. One has the following characterizations of standard objects in terms of filters and prefilters (also known as filterbases):
 Given a second topological space  a function  is continuous if and only if it preserves convergence of prefilters.
 Given a subset  of  the closure consists of all points  for which there is a prefilter on  converging to 

See also

Citations

Notes

References

 
 
 
 
  

Categories in category theory
General topology